Dimitrie Brătianu (1818–1892) was the Prime Minister of Romania from 22 April to 21 June 1881 and Minister of Foreign Affairs from 10 April 1881 until 8 June 1881. He was the son of Dincă Brătianu and the older brother of Ion C. Brătianu. As mayor of Bucharest, he witnessed a major event in Romania's history: the arrival of King Carol I of Hohenzollern-Sigmaringen, the first king of Romania. Brătianu received Carol I near the Baneasa forest, where he gave a speech to over 30,000 people.

Note

 

1818 births
1892 deaths
People from Pitești
Dimitrie
Chairpersons of the National Liberal Party (Romania)
Prime Ministers of Romania
Romanian Ministers of Agriculture
Romanian Ministers of Culture
Romanian Ministers of Education
Romanian Ministers of Foreign Affairs
Romanian Ministers of Public Works
Presidents of the Chamber of Deputies (Romania)
Members of the Senate of Romania
Mayors of Bucharest